Tapinoma rectinotum is a species of ant in the genus Tapinoma. Described by Wheeler in 1927, the species is endemic to China.

References

Tapinoma
Hymenoptera of Asia
Insects described in 1927